Sir Robert Borden High School (SRB, Borden) is a high school located on Greenbank Road in the Nepean district of Ottawa, Ontario, Canada. Adjacent to the main office of the Ottawa-Carleton District School Board, this school was built in 1969 and officially opened on December 5, 1969.  It is named after the late Conservative Prime Minister of Canada, Robert Borden.

Architecturally, the building itself is divided into several different wings. The wing known affectionately as "The Square" (Named after its imposing shape overlooking Greenbank Road) houses the science, computer, English, and combined French and social sciences departments. Another wing, "The Circle", which overlooks sports fields and a local neighbourhood, houses the Technology and Drama departments, the keyboarding room and all Grade 7 to 8 classes starting in 2017-2018 School year. These two wings are centred on a foyer on the main level, which is a popular place for students to socialize. The additional courses are provided in portables northeast of most of the school near where the Middle-schoolers have recess. The portables contains the remainder of the departments that could not fit into the interior of the school due to the allocated space to the Grade 7/8s. The portables also contains the Athletics department, as the Health units of Gym/Fitness and certain courses is taught there. The Foyer is the centre of the school, being at the entrance in cross-roads between the square, gymnasium, auditorium, locker bay and library. The foyer is currently used to host activities like the "Foyer Games" which is a party game-like activity with games like Horses and Cavaliers occurring during Fridays, Thursdays when Friday isn't available and Spirit Weeks. A sound system was installed to facilitate performances by student bands or student council activities over the lunch hour during 1999. However, and as of 2019 it is currently not being used and unplugged in lieu of bringing speakers in. There is also a multi-purpose auditorium, which has partitions which can divide the hall into three smaller lecture theatres, and 2 large gymnasiums with their own partitions, which makes them ideal for hosting high school athletics.

Sir Robert Borden High School is often recognized in its community for its leading music, arts and athletics programs, having won many local sports championships and arts and music competitions. The school mascot, Bolt the Bengal, represents its many sports teams and clubs.

The school is also used after hours and on weekends by many community groups and sports leagues, and is often used as a polling station in municipal, provincial and federal elections.

Starting with the 2017-2018 year, the school includes grades 7-12, absorbing Greenbank Middle School.  The school's principal is Matt Gagnier.

Programs offered 
 Bilingual Program
 Cooperative Education
 Extended French
 Learning Disabled Program
 Semestered
 Summer courses (when construction isn't present)
 SHSM
 The Cooper Test
 AP Math and French

Notable alumni

Andrew Calof - professional hockey player 
Rajeev Dehejia - economics professor
Barbara Dunkelman - Rooster Teeth personality
Damon Barlow - Call of Duty world champion 
Fred Brathwaite - professional hockey player (former NHL player)
Roshell Bissett - film producer 
Dan Kanter - guitarist
Patrick Hayden - scientist
Kim Brunhuber - CBC reporter
 Ian Black - CBC meteorologist
Anthony Lemke - actor
Robert Livingstone - sport business producer / journalist
Shawn Menard - city councillor
Sandra Oh - actress 
Darren Pang - retired NHL player 
Jeff Zywicki - professional lacrosse player
Sekou Kaba - Olympic hurdler
Alison Kreviazuk - curler
Lynn Kreviazuk - curler
Cheryl Kreviazuk - curler

See also
List of high schools in Ontario

References

Middle schools in Ottawa
High schools in Ottawa
Educational institutions established in 1969
1969 establishments in Ontario